Cirsium cymosum is a North American species of thistle known by the common name peregrine thistle. It is native to the western United States, where it has been found in California, Oregon, Nevada, Utah, Idaho, Wyoming, and Montana.

Cirsium cymosum is a biennial or perennial herb with a maximum height just . It is coated in soft and coarse hairs and sometimes cobwebby fibers. The spiny leaves may reach  in length, especially toward the base of the stem. They are deeply cut into lobes which are lined with sharp teeth. The inflorescence is a cluster of flower heads each up to 3 centimeters long and 5 wide. The head is lined with sticky, spiny phyllaries and filled with dull white flowers.

Varieties
Cirsium cymosum var. canovirens (Rydb.) D.J.Keil - most of species range
Cirsium cymosum var. cymosum - California, Nevada, Oregon

References

External links
Jepson Manual Treatment
Calphotos Photo gallery, University of California

cymosum
Flora of the Western United States
Plants described in 1897
Flora without expected TNC conservation status